Emotions is Thelma Aoyama's second studio album, and her third album overall. The album was released on September 9, 2009. Two singles have been released from this album, " and ". "Kono Mama Zutto" was not included in this album. Aoyama also released "Motions - Thelma Clips Vol. 1", a collection of her music videos.

Track listing

Chart 
"Emotions" debuted at No. 9 on the Oricon Daily Chart on its first day.

Oricon Chart 

Total Sales: 18,031*

References

External links 
 Official Website

2009 albums
Thelma Aoyama albums
Universal J albums